Pierre van Pletzen (born 1 May 1952), is a South African actor, writer and director. He is best known for the role "Septimus van Zyl" in the television serial 7de Laan. He also worked as an administrator, artistic director, voice-artist, copywriter, and translator.

Personal life

van Pletzen was born on 1 May 1952 in Stilfontein, South Africa. He graduated from the University of Pretoria with a degree in drama.

He is married to fellow actress Sandra Vaughn since 1996. The couple have one son: Pierre-Henri, and one daughter: Zetske. His daughter Zetske is also an actress, who played the role of "Marcel van Niekerk" in the soapie 7de Laan.

Career

He made acting debut for Performing Arts Council of the Transvaal (PACT) and then at Performing Arts Council of the Orange Free State (PACOFS). In 1974, he acted in the play Die Ryk Weduwee for Cape Performing Arts Board (CAPAB). Meanwhile, he worked as a lecturer at Pretoria Technikon’s Drama School. In the mid 1980s, He was made Artistic Head of Drama for PACOFS. In 1982, he made television debut with the role "Momberg" in the television movie Gideon Scheepers. Then he acted as Eben Meintjies in the series 1922 in 1984, and as "Spike Potas" in the Afrikaans TV-series Orkney Snork Nie in 1989. In 1984, he made directorial debut with the play Babbelkous!. Then in 1988, he remade the play Sleuth, the revival of Anthony Shaffer which was performed at the Andre Huguenet.

In 1989, he made a supportive role in the Hollywood blockbuster The Gods Must Be Crazy II. In 1990, he acted in Windprints and The Fourth Reich. Then he acted in many films such as Taxi to Soweto (1991), Orkney Snork Nie! (1992), Orkney Snork Nie! 2 (1993) and Panic Mechanic (1996). In 1993, he directed the musical play Buddy at the Civic and later Haaks by Chris Vorster in 2005.

In 2000, he joined the cast of popular SABC1 soap opera 7de Laan and played the role as "Septimus van Zyl". He continued to play the role as a series regular for seven consecutive years until resigned in 2017. In the meantime, he became the director of the series until 2016. In 2017, he became the first South African artist to appear on three different television channels simultaneously, by starring in three different Afrikaans shows. After quit from 7de Laan, he joined with kykNET's Afrikaans soap Getroud met Rugby and played the role "Sakkie".

Filmography

References

External links
 IMDb

Living people
Afrikaner people
South African male film actors
1952 births
South African male television actors
South African television directors